Lorenzo Sonego was the defending champion and successfully defended his title, defeating Alejandro Davidovich Fokina 6–2, 4–6, 7–6(8–6) in the final.

Seeds
All seeds receive a bye into the second round.

Draw

Finals

Top half

Section 1

Section 2

Bottom half

Section 3

Section 4

References

External links
Main draw
Qualifying draw

2019 ATP Challenger Tour
2019 Singles
AON